Tamanna biuty actress

Arts and entertainment
Tamanna (1942 film), a Bollywood film
Tamanna (1997 film), an Indian drama film by Mahesh Bhatt
Tamanna (2014 film), a British-Pakistani production
Tamanna (TV series), an Indian Hindi soap opera

People
Tamanna (actress) (1948–2012), Pakistani film actress
Tamannaah (born 1989), Indian model and actress
Faramarz Tamanna, Afghan academic and politician
Tamanna Miah, a British Bangladeshi campaigner
Tamannaah, Indian actress, sometimes credited as Tamanna

See also

Sarfaroshi ki Tamanna, a patriotic poem in Urdu
Ek Tamanna Lahasil Si, a 2012 Pakistani drama serial
Tamanna House, a thriller television series aired on Zee TV